The following is a list of battles fought by the Eastern Roman or Byzantine Empire, from the 6th century AD until its dissolution in the mid-15th century, organized by date. The list is not exhaustive. For battles fought by the Byzantine Empire's Roman predecessors, see List of Roman battles.

6th century 
 503 – Siege of Amida (502–503) – The Persians captured the city of Amida.
 528 – Battle of Thannuris (and/or Battle of Mindouos) – Sassanid Persians defeat Byzantines under Belisarius, death of Jabalah IV ibn al-Harith.
 530 –
 Battle of Dara – Belisarius defeats the Persians
 Battle of Satala – Byzantine Empire defeats the Sassanid Empire
 531 – Battle of Callinicum – Persian general Azarethes defeats Belisarius
 533 –
 13 September Battle of Ad Decimum – Belisarius defeats Vandals near Carthage
 15 December Battle of Tricamarum – Belisarius defeats again the Vandals near Carthage.
 535 –
 Battle of Mammes
 Battle of Mount Bourgaon
 536 – Siege of Naples – Byzantines capture Naples
 537 – Battle of Scalas Veteres
 537–38 – Siege of Rome – Byzantines defend Rome against the Ostrogoths
538 – 
Siege of Ariminum – Byzantines take Ariminum from the Ostrogoths 
Siege of Urbinus – Byzantines take Urbinus from the Ostrogoths 
Siege of Urviventus – Byzantines take Urviventus from the Ostrogoths 
539 – Siege of Auximus – Byzantines take Auximus from the Ostrogoths 
539–540 Siege of Ravenna — Byzantines force the Ostrogothic king to surrender 
 541 – 
 Siege of Petra – Sasanians capture Petra, Lazica from the Byzantines
 Battle of Nisibis – Byzantines defeat the Persians 
 Siege of Sisauranon – The Sasanian garrison went over to the Byzantine side
 Siege of Verona – Ostrogoths under Totila repel the Byzantines
 542 – 
 Battle of Faventia – Ostrogoths under Totila defeat the combined Byzantine armies
 Battle of Mucellium – Ostrogoths under Totila defeat the Byzantines
 542–543 – Siege of Naples – Totila recaptures Naples
 543 – Battle of Anglon – The Byzantine invasion of Persarmenia is defeated
 544 – 
 Battle of Cillium – The Byzantine governor of Africa Solomon is killed by the Moors
 Siege of Edessa – Unsuccessful siege of the Byzantine fortress of Edessa by the Sasanians
 546 – Sack of Rome by Totila, King of the Ostrogoths
546 or 547 – Battle of Sufetula – Byzantine victory over the Moors
 548 – Battle of the Fields of Cato – The new Byzantine commander, John Troglita, crushes the Moorish uprising
 551 – 
 Battle of Sena Gallica – Byzantine fleet destroys the Ostrogothic navy
 Siege of Petra (550–551) – Byzantines recapture and destroy Petra, Lazica from the Sasanians
 552 – Battle of Taginae – Narses replaces Belisarius and defeats Ostrogoths under Totila
 553 –
 Battle of Mons Lactarius Narses defeats the Ostrogoths under Teia
 Battle of Telephis–Ollaria – Byzantines are repelled by a Sasanian assault
 554, October – Battle of the Volturnus – Narses defeats the Franks
 559  – Battle of Melantias – Belisarius defeats the Kutrigurs
 555 – Siege of Phasis – Sasanian siege of the town Phasis is defeated by the Byzantines
 573 – 
 Siege of Nisibis – Failed Byzantine siege of Nisibis
 Siege of Dara – Sassanid Empire captures the strategic fortress of Dara
 576 – Battle of Melitene – Byzantine Empire defeats the Sassanid Empire
 586 – Battle of Solachon – Byzantine Empire defeats the Sassanid Empire
 588 – Battle of Martyropolis – Byzantine Empire defeats the Sassanid Empire
 591 – Battle of Blarathon – Byzantines defeat Bahram Chobin and help Khosrau II to recover his throne

7th century 

 613 – Battle of Antioch
 614 –
 Siege of Caesarea
 Siege of Jerusalem
 626 – Siege of Constantinople
 627 – Battle of Nineveh
 629 – Battle of Mu'tah
 634 –
 Battle of Bosra
 Battle of Ajnadayn
 Battle of Fahl
 Siege of Damascus
 Battle of Maraj-al-Debaj
 635–636 – Siege of Emesa
 636 – Battle of Yarmouk
 637 –
 Siege of Jerusalem
 Battle of Hazir
 637 –
 Siege of Aleppo
 Battle of the Iron Bridge
 638 – Siege of Germanicia
 640 – Battle of Heliopolis
 641 – Siege of Alexandria
 646 – Battle of Nikiou
 647 – Battle of Sufetula
 655 – Battle of the Masts
 674–678 – Siege of Constantinople
 680 – Battle of Ongal
 682 or 683 – Battle of Vescera
 692 – Battle of Sebastopolis
 698 – Battle of Carthage

8th century 

 707–708 or 708–709 – Siege of Tyana – Umayyads besiege and capture Tyana
 708 – Battle of Anchialus (708)
 717–718 – Siege of Constantinople – Second and last siege of Constantinople by the Arabs
 727 – Siege of Nicaea – Unsuccessful siege of Nicaea by the Arabs
 740 – Battle of Akroinon – Byzantine emperor Leo III the Isaurian destroys an Arab invasion force
 746 – Battle of Keramaia
 756 – Battle of Marcellae
 759 – Battle of the Rishki Pass
 763 – Battle of Anchialus
 766 – Siege of Kamacha – Unsuccessful Abbasid siege of the fort of Kamacha
 774 – Battle of Berzitia
 782 – Abbasid invasion of Asia Minor – Harun al-Rashid leads his troops as far as Chrysopolis
 788 – Battle of Kopidnadon – Byzantines defeated by Abbasid invasion
 792 – Battle of Marcellae

9th century 
 804 – Battle of Krasos – Abbasid army defeats emperor Nikephoros I
 806 – Abbasid invasion of Asia Minor – Harun al-Rashid invades Asia Minor and sacks Heraclea
 811 – Battle of Pliska – Emperor Nikephoros I is defeated by Bulgarian army
 827–828 – Siege of Syracuse – Unsuccessful siege of Syracuse by the Aghlabids
 829 – Battle of Thasos – Byzantine fleet is defeated by Emirate of Crete
 838 –
 Battle of Anzen – Emperor Theophilos is defeated by the Abbasids under Afshin.
 Sack of Amorium – Abbasids under Caliph al-Mu'tasim besiege and sack the city of Amorium
 844 – Battle of Mauropotamos – Abbasid army defeats the Byzantines under Theoktistos
 853 – Sack of Damietta – Byzantine fleet raids and captures the port of Damietta in Egypt 
 862 – Capture of Faruriyyah – Abbasids capture the border fortress of Farurriyah
 863 – Battle of Lalakaon – Byzantine army under Petronas annihilates the army of Malatya and kills its emir, Umar al-Aqta
 868 – Siege of Ragusa – Byzantine fleet under Niketas Ooryphas relieves Ragusa and restores Byzantine control over Dalmatia
 872 or 878 – Battle of Bathys Ryax – The Byzantines defeat the Paulicians and kill their leader, Chrysocheir
 872 or 873 – Battle of Kardia – Byzantine fleet under Niketas Ooryphas defeats the Cretan Saracens under the renegade Photios
 873 or 879 – Battle of the Gulf of Corinth – Byzantine fleet under Niketas Ooryphas defeats the Cretan Saracens under the renegade Photios
 877–878 – Siege of Syracuse – Fall of Syracuse to the Aghlabids
 880 –
 Battle of Cephalonia – Nasar defeats an Aghlabid fleet raiding western Greece in a night battle
 Battle of Stelai – Nasar defeats an Aghlabid fleet off Calabria
 After 883 : Siege of Euripos
 888  – Battle of Milazzo – Aghlabids defeat Byzantines
 896 – Battle of Boulgarophygon – Bulgarian Army defeats Byzantines under Leo Katakalon

10th century 
 902 – Siege of Taormina – The former Aghlabid emir, Ibrahim II, captures the fortress of Taormina
 904 Sack of Thessalonica
 915 Battle of Garigliano
 917 –
 Battle of Achelous
 Battle of Katasyrtai
 922 – Battle of Pegae
 941 – Rus' raid against Constantinople and Bithynia
 953 – Battle of Marash
 958 – Battle of Raban
 960 – Battle of Andrassos
 962 – Siege of Taormina – The Fatimids capture the fortress of Taormina
 965 – Battle of the Straits – The Fatimids destroy a Byzantine invasion fleet under Niketas Abalantes
 970 – Battle of Arcadiopolis
 970–971 – Siege of Dorostolon
 971 – Battle of Alexandretta
 986 – Battle of the Gates of Trajan
 994 – Battle of the Orontes
 995 – Battle of Thessalonica
 997 – Battle of Spercheios
 998 – Battle of Apamea

11th century 
 1004 – 
 Battle of Skopje
 Battle of Thessalonica
 1009 – Battle of Kreta
 1014 – 
 Battle of Thessalonica
 Battle of Kleidion
 Battle of Strumica
 1015 – Battle of Bitola
 1017 – Battle of Setina
 1018 – 
 Battle of Dyrrhachium
 Battle of Cannae
 1021 – Battle of Shirimni
 1022 – Battle of Svindax
 1024 – Battle of Lemnos
 1030 – Battle of Azaz
 1040 –
 Battle of Thessalonica
 Battle of Thessalonica
 1041 – 
 Battle of Ostrovo
 Battle of Olivento
 Battle of Montemaggiore
 Battle of Montepeloso
 1043 – Rus' raid into the Aegean Sea
 1047 – Battle of Sasireti
 1048 – Battle of Kapetron
 1053-Battle of Zygos Pass
 1054 – Battle of Manzikert
 1067 – Battle of Caesarea
 1068–71 – Siege of Bari
 1069 – Battle of Iconium
 1071 – Battle of Manzikert
 1078 – Battle of Kalavrye
 1081 – Battle of Dyrrhachium
 1091 – Battle of Levounion
 1097 – Siege of Nicaea

12th century 
 1107–1108 – Siege of Dyrrhachium
 1113 – Siege of Nicaea
 1116 – Battle of Philomelion
 1122 – Battle of Beroia
 1138 – Siege of Shaizar
 1167 – Battle of Sirmium
 1176 – Battle of Myriokephalon
 1177 – Battle of Hyelion and Leimocheir
 1185 –
 Sack of Thessalonica
 Battle of Demetritzes
 1187 – Siege of Lovech
 1190 – Battle of Tryavna
 1194 – Battle of Arcadiopolis
 1196 – Battle of Serres

13th century 

 1201 – Siege of Varna
 1203 – Siege of Constantinople – First attack on Constantinople by the Fourth Crusade, deposition of Alexios III Angelos
 1204 – Siege of Constantinople – Second attack and capture of Constantinople by the Fourth Crusade, dissolution of the Byzantine Empire, establishment of the Latin Empire
 1205 – 
 Battle of the Olive Grove of Kountouras
 Battle of Adramyttium
 1205–06 – Siege of Trebizond
 1207 – Siege of Attalia
 1211 – 
 Battle of Antioch on the Meander
 Battle of the Rhyndacus
 1214 – Siege of Sinope
 1222–23 – Siege of Trebizond
 1223 or 1224 – Battle of Poimanenon
 1230 – Battle of Klokotnitsa – Bulgarians defeat and capture Theodore Komnenos Doukas
 1235 – Siege of Constantinople – Unsuccessful joint Bulgarian–Nicaean siege of Constantinople
 1254 – Battle of Adrianople
 1259 – Battle of Pelagonia
 1260 – Siege of Constantinople
 1263 –
 Battle of Prinitza
 Battle of Settepozzi
 1263 or 1264 – Battle of Makryplagi
 1272/73 or 1274/75 – 
 Battle of Neopatras
 Battle of Demetrias
 1279 – Battle of Devina
 1280–81 – Siege of Berat

14th century 

 1304 – 
 Battle of Bapheus – First Ottoman victory over the regular Byzantine army
 Battle of Skafida – Bulgarians defeat the Byzantines
 1305 – Battle of Apros -The Catalan Company defeats the Byzantines
 1310 – Conquest of Rhodes – Hospitallers capture Rhodes
 1320 – Battle of Saint George — The Byzantines under Andronikos Asen ambush and defeat the forces of the Principality of Achaea, securing possession of Arcadia.
 1320–26 – Siege of Prussa – The Ottomans capture the city of Prussa, which becomes their capital
 1329 – Battle of Pelekanon – The Ottomans defeat the last Byzantine attempt to defend Asia Minor
 1328–31 – Siege of Nicaea – Ottomans capture the city of Nicaea
 1332 – Battle of Rusokastro – Bulgarians defeat the Byzantines
 1333–37 – Siege of Nicomedia – Fall of Nicomedia to the Ottomans
 1354 – Fall of Gallipoli – Capture of Gallipoli by the Ottomans, first Ottoman stronghold in Europe
 1366 – Reconquest of Gallipoli – Amadeus VII, Count of Savoy, recovers Gallipoli for the Byzantines
 1390 – Fall of Philadelphia – Ottomans capture Philadelphia, the last Byzantine stronghold in Asia

15th century 

 1411 – Siege of Constantinople – Ottomans besiege Constantinople 
 1422 – Siege of Constantinople – Ottomans besiege Constantinople
 1422–30 – Siege of Thessalonica – Ottomans besiege and capture Thessalonica (after 1423 held by Venice)
 1427 – Battle of the Echinades
 1453 – Fall of Constantinople – Ottoman Sultan Mehmed II captures Constantinople, ending the Byzantine Empire
 1461 – Siege of Trebizond – Sultan Mehmed II captures Trebizond, ending the Empire of Trebizond

Byzantine
 
Byzantine battles
Battles